Filippo Barbieri may refer to:

 Filippo Barbieri (historian) (1426–1487), Italian renaissance humanist
 Filippo Barbieri (cyclist) (born 1983), Brazilian mountainbiker